Crad Evans was a Welsh football player and manager. He represented Wales at amateur international level.
 
Evans moved to the Torquay area in 1904 from Wales, joining Ellacombe Football Club before moving to the newly formed Torquay Town side. He was Torquay's top goalscorer in five of the following seasons and later played for Plymouth Argyle and Exeter City.

In 1921 he became Torquay United's first ever player-manager.

References

https://web.archive.org/web/20140906224028/http://www.plymouthherald.co.uk/Green-Barmy-100-years-players-wore-red-green/story-17593725-detail/story.html

Welsh footballers
Torquay United F.C. players
Plymouth Argyle F.C. players
Exeter City F.C. players
Welsh football managers
Torquay United F.C. managers
Year of death missing
Year of birth missing
Association football forwards